Sandama is a small town in south central Malawi.  To the immediate east is a border with Mozambique.

Transport
Sandama is served by a station on the main south line of the national railway system.

See also
 Railway stations in Malawi

References

Populated places in Southern Region, Malawi